Rubroporus is a small genus of neotropical fungi in the family Polyporaceae. The type species, R. carneoporis, is found in Brazil where it causes a white rot on Alchornea triplinervia. Rubroporus aurantiaca, found in Belize, was added to the genus in 2007.

References

Polyporaceae
Polyporales genera
Taxa described in 2002